Sylvia Nickerson (she/her) is a Canadian comic book writer.  In May 2020 Nickerson received The Nipper, one of the Doug Wright Awards for comic book artists, for her work Creation.  Creations themes include the changes she underwent when she became a mother, and how the works of artist helped shape the gentrification of her home town. She is currently an assistant professor and adjunct professor at the University of Toronto and McMaster University, respectively. 

Nickerson, a resident of Hamilton, Ontario, was interviewed by the Hamilton Spectator, on April 4, 2019.

References

Canadian comics writers
21st-century Canadian women writers
Living people
Writers from Hamilton, Ontario
Year of birth missing (living people)